Kalkara is a village in the South Eastern Region of Malta, with a population of 3,014 as of March 2014. The name is derived from the Latin word for lime (Calce), and it is believed that there was a lime kiln present there since Roman times. Kalkara forms part of the inner harbour area and occupies the area around Kalkara Creek. The town has its own Local Council and is bordered by the cities of Birgu and Żabbar, as well as the town of Xgħajra.

History
The village of Kalkara developed as a small fishing community around the sheltered inlet of Kalkara Creek. Some historians believe that the land that today is known as Kalkara, was one of the first to be inhabited by the initial dwellers of Malta that came from nearby island of Sicily. The idea behind this theory is that the inlets of the Grand Harbour could have provided these primitive emigrants with the needed shelter after having endured their long voyage in the Mediterranean Sea. Nevertheless, such theories cannot be proven and Kalkara's early history will remain largely unknown.

The Christian era in Kalkara presumably began with the construction of the Palaeochristian hypogea in the zone known as Xagħra ta' Santa Duminka situated in its parish boundary. In them, the first Christian cults began to be performed and this is today attributed to the depiction of an Orant inside the hypogea.

The name given to this village, Kalkara, comes from the Latin word calce literally meaning lime (in Maltese ġir), the reason for this being that in this locality lime-kilns were usually found. Thus, its motto is A Calce Nomen. The emblem is a green scutcheon, divided into two parts: half being blue representing the sea, and the other being gold with a burning flame.

When in 1530 the Knights of St John came over to Malta and established their headquarters at nearby Birgu, they initiated a process of development and fortification of the area, which culminated with the construction of the Cottonera Lines; a massive line of fortifications enclosing the cities of Birgu, Bormla and Isla into the area known as Cottonera, and the construction of Fort Ricasoli at the mouth of the Grand Harbour. As the years went by, corsair and Turkish attacks on the Maltese Islands came to a virtual end, and this newly found feeling of safety ensured that Kalkara developed as a suburb of Cottonera, and most especially the city of Vittoriosa (Birgu).

The population slowly increased and in the 19th and 20th century Kalkara developed into a small yet charming seaside resort while its waterfront and historical centre acquired its current layout. During this period Cottonera was a major residential, commercial and industrial hub especially due to the presence of the Drydocks, which were used by the British Royal Navy since the very beginning of their stay in Malta. Initially most of the new houses in Kalkara were built as summer residences by people from the Cottonera area where they enjoyed a respite from their busier lifestyles but as time went by and land for development in Cottonera itself became very limited, more people started to settle permanently in Kalkara itself. Many of these houses, built between the 1850s and the 1950s, stand to this very day and are locally referred to as Town Houses, which are essentially terraced houses with two floors having a traditional Maltese timber balcony, stone slab ceilings supported by wooden or iron beams and Maltese patterned floor tiles. Some of these houses, especially along the waterfront, are more elaborate than others and include three or four floors and also intricate stone carvings. This increase in population led to the elevation of Kalkara to an independent parish from Vittoriosa in 1897. 

Although not strategically important in itself, Kalkara bore the brunt of World War II due to its close proximity to Cottonera and its Drydocks. The first parish church, which was located close to the present parish church, was completely destroyed during an air attack on 10 April 1942.

Following the gaining of Independence by Malta in 1964, the whole country witnessed a period of high development and construction, which also left its impact on Kalkara, albeit to a lesser degree. A new housing estate was built by the government in the area close to Bighi Hospital, while further development included the construction of large terraced houses and small villas along the area flanked by Triq il-Missjoni Taljana. Nevertheless, Kalkara still retains a charming and quiet atmosphere and constantly features in many paintings and postcards that highlight its picturesque location.

Geography
Kalkara is located on the eastern coast of Malta and forms part of the inner harbour area of the Grand Harbour. It occupies the area around Kalkara Creek and extends to both valley sides around the creek. Rinella Bay, the only sandy beach in the Grand Harbour, is found at the mouth of the Rinella valley. Kalkara is one of the few localities within the Grand Harbour area that still has relatively large open spaces that naturally divide it from other towns and villages. The town is bordered by the cities of Birgu and Żabbar, as well as the town of Xgħajra.

Administration

Since the enactment of the Local Councils Act in the year 1993, Kalkara has been the seat of a Local Council, which is responsible for an array of local matters including the general upkeep of the locality, maintenance and construction of residential roads, and the local environment.

The Local Council is currently made up of 5 councillors who are:
Wayne Aquilina (Mayor) – PL
Vince Bongailas (Vice Mayor) – PL
Speranza Chircop – PL
Christopher Bruno – PL
Maria Sultana – PN

Demographics

According to the latest records as of March 2014, Kalkara's population stood at 3,014, having risen from 2,856 in December 2009. Its pleasant and quiet surroundings coupled with relatively lower real estate prices make Kalkara an ideal location in which to reside, making Kalkara one of the localities that are witnessing an increase in its population.

Culture

Band Clubs

Circolo San Giuseppe Filarmonika Sagra Familja A.D 1897
St. Joseph Band Club A.D. 1987 (L-Għaqda Mużikali San Ġużepp A.D. 1987)

Local NGOs

Assoċjazzjoni Wirt il-Kalkara

Main Sights

The Chapel of Our Saviour (Tas-Salvatur)

Early historians give us the year 1487 as the most probable date in which a chapel dedicated to Jesus Christ under the title of Our Saviour was founded in the area known as "la punta sottile della Rinella". However, from pastoral visits that were done during the time of the Knights of the Order of Saint John, this chapel was pulled done upon order by the Grand Master Jean Parisot de la Valette during the Great Siege of 1565. The given reason was that through being demolished, it would not provide any shelter for the invading Turks.

In 1580, Claudio Abela and Davidde Burlò received permission from the Grand Master La Cassiere to build a chapel in the same site where the mentioned chapel stood. In this chapel, bailiff Fra Giovanni Bichi, nephew of Pope Alexander VII, was buried in 1676 after having died in a plague epidemic.

Meanwhile, in 1680 this chapel was again rebuilt, this time to the design of the Maltese architect Lorenzo Gafà. The commission came from Fra Mario Bichi, who was the nephew of Fra Mario. The titular painting of this chapel showed the Transfiguration of Our Lord and was painted by Mattia Preti. Unfortunately, this painting was stolen in 1798 by the invading French, so a replacement was painted by Francesco Madiona.

The feast of Our Saviour was celebrated annually on 6 August. On this day and till 1811, local bread was shared out among the villagers. This chapel had large amounts of land in its possession, among which the land on which Bighi Naval Hospital was built.

The Chapel of Our Saviour served as the Parish Church of Kalkara in the 1940s, after the first Parish Church was totally destroyed in the Second World War.

The First Parish Church

On 23 August 1884, the businessman Fortunato Gulia donated a piece of land that he owned in Kalkara for the building of a new church. The bishop entrusted this piece of work to Fr. Joseph Azzopardi, who at that time was Rector of the Chapel of Our Saviour. Another piece of land was bought from the Chapter of Cospicua so as to be added to the one donated by Gulia, and on 13 September 1884, Fr. Azzopardi set up a committee for the building up of this Church. The committee members were: Mr. Carmelo Bugeja, Mr. Fortunato Gulia, Mr. Gio Batta Farrugia, Mr. Orazio Agius, and Mr. Paolo Debono as Secretary.

Fr. Joseph Azzopardi commissioned Guglielmo Attard as Architect of this project, and instantly donations began to be collected. It was on 22 June 1890 that the bishop solemnly blessed the first stone of the Church, during a festive atmosphere that was organised. In 1895, the construction of the Church, which was decided to be dedicated to Saint Joseph Patron of the Universal Church, had been finished, and hence in 1896 decorations in stone began to be done.

Some paintings were also commissioned, among which one may mention: the painting of Saint Philip commission by F. Cilia & Co. (the masons of the Church) to the painter Lazzaro Pisani, and the painting of Our Lady of the Rosary. A statue of Saint Joseph made by Etienne Puccini was brought by Fr. Azzopardi from Toulouse, France.

On 10 December 1897, Kalkara became an independent Parish, and from that date onwards, the Parish Church began to be enriched with other magnificent pieces of sacred art. The first Parish Priest was Fr. Joseph Ciangura of Senglea. The titular painting, commissioned to Giuseppe Calì and showing Saint Joseph as the Patron Saint of the Universal Church, was finished by 1898, and the first processional feast was done during that year. In 1899, the sacred reliquary came from Italy. In the beginning of the 20th century, the pulpit, a statue of Our Lady of the Rosary, and a girandola, among other things, emerged in the Parish Church, through the great zeal of the parishioners.

The church was consecrated on 30 January 1921, and in 1921 Circolo San Giuseppe commissioned a new statue of Saint Joseph from Agostino Camilleri. In 1923, the first stone of the belfry was collocated, and after this was duly finished, the bell made by Julius Cauchi in 1896 sounded its first motives. In 1925, Fr. Eleazzaro Balzan became the new Parish Priest. In 1933 he commissioned a superbly designed organ balcony.

However, on 10 April 1942, the Parish Church was heavily assaulted by enemy bombardments from the air in the Second World War. Unfortunately, the Church was fully demolished through these bombardments, and tragically enough, all its treasures were lost including the titular statue, which was found in pieces. However, the destiny of the paintings was different, since these were saved by Mons. Michael Gonzi, Gozo's bishop, who had taken them to the sister island of Gozo for refuge some time before.

To commemorate where the old church once stood (in Saint Michael Street), a marble plaque was erected by Circolo San Giuseppe Filarmonika Sagra Familja.

The Present Parish Church

On 21 November 1943, Rev. Carmelo Xuereb was officially installed as the third Parish Priest of Kalkara. His main duty was to rebuild the Parish Church and the community of Kalkara after these were destroyed through World War II. In 1944 a temporary church was inaugurated in the ex-Malta Gas Works stores. During this period, a new design for the new Parish Church was approved. This was made by Chev. Vincenzo Bonello with the necessary help of Ġużè Damato. Having a neo-classical design, the new Parish Church was to be built in another place from where it previously stood. Thus, Archbishop Mons. Michael Gonzi bought a piece of land known as tal-Għeżieli near the strand of Kalkara.

The first stone of the new church was blessed on 13 October 1946 and it took nearly six years to be fully built up. All the residents of Kalkara gave a helping hand in this project, even women and children. The building is a masterpiece in sculpture in Maltese globigerina limestone. Meanwhile, on 13 March 1949, the new titular statue representing Saint Joseph as Patron of the Universal Church arrived in Kalkara through a pilgrimage from nearby Cospicua. This statue is also a masterpiece in wood and was sculptured by the renowned artist Ferdinando Stuflesser in Bolzano, Italy through a design of Chev. Vincenzo Bonello. With this statue, another one representing Our Lady of Lourdes was also commissioned.

The new church was duly finished by 7 September 1952 when it was blessed by Mons. Gonzi. The same Archbishop celebrated the first mass in it few moments after the blessing. However, after 1952, the new Parish Church began to be decorated by other works of art. In 1953 Mr. Loreto Mintoff donated a fine marble high-altar for the church from Pietrasanta in Italy. Other works of art such as the marble pulpit, the marble pavement of the church, the Via Sacra, among others were duly blessed in future years. The new Parish Church was consecrated on 12 December 1954. In future years further works of art have been made to decorate "one of the most splendid churches built after World War II".

Kalkara Cross
A cross made out of stone stands out in Rnella Street Kalkara. The cross commemorates the event marking the end of the Great siege of 1565 – when the Ottoman Empire at war with the Knights, lost their posts from where they attacked Vittoriosa.

Legend has it that the Knights together with the Maltese and one of their commanders went to Kalkara to see the Muslims leave Malta and the commander grabbed his sword, put it in the ground where it took on the form of a Cross and fell to his knees whereupon he thanked God that this land had once again became Christian land under the rule of knights.

Later to commemorate this event, a cross was built but was destroyed in the second world war, only some old photographs remain. Interestingly the Chapel of the Redeemer was demolished by the Knights to prevent the Ottomans to hide behind it and later rebuilt after the siege, this cross was erected to commemorate this event.

The reconstruction of the Kalkara cross was inaugurated by Hon. Glenn Bedingfield and the Assoċjazzjoni Wirt il-Kalkara on Friday 6 September 2019 with the collaboration of the Restoration Directorate and the Kalkara Local Council.

Kalkara Naval Cemetery
The Kalkara Naval Cemetery on Triq San leonardu contains 1085 graves of military personnel killed in the country in World War I and World War II and 1,445 non-war burials. Many graves are marked by Commonwealth War Graves Commission (CWGC) gravestones. The Japanese Naval Memorial commemorates the death of Japanese submariners who were killed defending Malta in World War I.

Fortifications

Due to its location, one may find various important examples of fortifications in and around Kalkara.

Fort Ricasoli

The design of this fort was done by Count Valperga in 1670. Previously on the same site of its erection, there was a tower known as "Torri Orsi", but Grand Master Nicholas Cottoner decided that a new fort should be built on the Rinella Peninsula so as to safeguard the entrance of the Grand Harbour from the invading Turks. Comm. Giovanni Francesco Ricasoli donated a large sum of money for its completion, and due to this after it was duly finished, the fort was given the name "Ricasoli". The fort was extensively used both by the Knights of Saint John and even by the British, who also used it as a prison. In this fort there is a Chapel of St Nicholas.

Rinella Battery

Rinella Battery was built by the British in the nineteenth century and is being professionally restored and administered by Fondazzjoni Wirt Artna, a local NGO. The battery is open to the public regularly and its greatest attraction is the world's largest cannon – The Armstrong 100-ton gun – which is also fired during historical re-enactments.

Other notable buildings

Villa Bighi

In 1650, together with the chapel of Our Saviour, Fra Giovanni Bighi erected near the same site a large villa overlooking the entrance of the Grand Harbour. During the plague of 1813 this villa was used as a temporary hospital. However, through a decree by King George IV, on 23 March 1830, Vice-Admiral Sir P. Malcolm laid down the foundation stone of a Naval Hospital on the site where Villa Bighi was situated after it was pulled down. Bighi Naval Hospital took two years to be completed and figured £20,000 of capital expenditure. During the British reign it was used extensively, and nowadays it is serving as an International School of Restoration. After an extensive restoration and modernisation Villa Bighi now hosts am Interactive Centre for Science and Innovation known as Esplora.

Villa Portelli

Overlooking Kalkara Creek there is Villa Portelli, a large villa built by Sir Agostino Portelli as a summer residence. Through World War II this villa served as the residence of the flag officer, while in 1961 admirals began to use it as their residence.

All above information was edited by Circolo San Giuseppe Filarmonika Sagra Familja, Kalkara (A.D. 1897) and taken from www.sagrafamilja.org.

Economy
As part of the government's vision to breathe a new lease of life into the Grand Harbour area, the site formerly occupied by the former Ricasoli Industrial Estate in the outskirts of Kalkara was earmarked to host the construction of Smart City Malta, which will be built on the same lines of Dubai Internet City. Construction began in 2008 and SCM1, the first office block, was completed and work is currently ongoing on the rest of the project, which will include office space, a hotel, residential units, catering establishments, and landscaped areas open to the public. According to the government this project will not only create around 7,000 new jobs when completed but will also inject new life in the area.

In keeping with Kalkara's maritime tradition, in 2010 the government announced the setting up of a temporary marina in Kalkara creek in order to provide more berthing spots for the ever-increasing demand from this sector.

The town also hosts the Malta Film Commission and the main facilities of the Malta Film Studios.

Transport
Kalkara is regularly served by scheduled buses operated by Arriva Malta on Route number 3, which connects Kalkara directly to the capital Valletta. The transport strategy for the Grand Harbour area also envisages a ferry service point in Kalkara with links to Valletta, the Three Cities and other areas within the harbour. Route number 213 also passes from some parts of Kalkara, which provides access to transport to Mater dei hospital.

Due to the construction and development of Smart City Malta in the Ricasoli area, the construction of the South Harbour Link Road has been proposed in order to upgrade and improve the road network of the area and also cater for the influx of traffic once Smart City Malta is fully operational. The proposed new Link Road would directly link Smart City Malta to Malta's main arterial road network, however this proposal, which is still in its initial stages, would sacrifice agricultural land in the area between Kalkara and Haz-Zabbar if approved.

Sport
Kalkara is known for the building of the local traditional boats, known as the Maltese dgħajsa and for their oarsmen (barklori). The Kalkariżi still take part in the traditional national regattas held on 8 September and on 31 March with their own constructed boats.

Zones in Kalkara
Bighi 
Fort Ricasoli
Il-Wileġ (The Open Fields)
It-Turretta (The Turrett)
Kalkara Creek
Ricasoli Point
Rinella Bay
Rnella Valley
San Pietru (Saint Peter)
Santa Liberata (Saint Liberatas)
Santu Rokku (Saint Rocco)
Smart City Malta (Ricasoli Industrial Estate)
Ta' Tewma (Garlic's Village)
Ta' Wied Għammieq (Ghammieq Valley's Village)
Tar-Ramel (Sandy Village)
Villa Portelli
Wied Rinella (Rinella Valley)

Main Roads

Misraħ l-Arċisqof Gonzi (Archbishop Gonzi Square)
Triq il-Marina (Marina Street)
Triq il-Missjoni Taljana (Italian Mission Street)
Triq ir-Rnella (Rnella Street)
Triq San Leonardu (St. Leonard Street)
Triq Santa Liberta (St Libertas Street)
Triq Santu Rokku (St Rocco Street)
Xatt tal-Kalkara (Kalkara Strand)

Twin towns – sister cities

Kalkara is twinned with:
 Crespellano, Italy
 Halifax, Canada

See also
RNH Bighi
SmartCity Malta
Kalkara F.C.

References

External links

Kalkara Local Council (Main Introductory Page)
Circolo San Giuseppe Filarmonika Sagra Familja
St. Joseph's Band Club (Ghaqda Muzikali San Guzepp)
Assoċjazzjoni Wirt il-Kalkara

 
Towns in Malta
Local councils of Malta